Wayward is a 1932 American Pre-Code drama film directed by Edward Sloman and written by Gladys Unger (with Lillian Day and Mateel Howe Farnham). The film stars Nancy Carroll, Richard Arlen, Pauline Frederick, John Litel, and Margalo Gillmore. It was released on February 19, 1932, by Paramount Pictures.

Cast
Nancy Carroll as Daisy Frost
Richard Arlen as David Frost
Pauline Frederick as Mrs. Eleanor Frost
John Litel as Robert 'Bob' Daniels
Margalo Gillmore as Louisa Daniels
Burke Clarke as Uncle Judson
Dorothy Stickney as Hattie
Gertrude Michael as Mary Morton
Sidney Easton as George
Mae Questel as Showgirl

References

External links
 

1932 films
American drama films
1932 drama films
Paramount Pictures films
Films directed by Edward Sloman
American black-and-white films
1930s English-language films
1930s American films